POL–Aqua was a Polish professional cycling team, which competed in elite road bicycle racing events such as the UCI Women's Road World Cup.

Major wins
2008
Majowy Wyscig Klasyczny – Lublin, Joanna Ignasiak
Stage 3 Wyscig Etapowy – Zamość, Magdalena Zamolska

References

Cycling teams based in Poland
UCI Women's Teams
Cycling teams established in 2008